"Delicious!: The Best of Hitomi Shimatani" is the first compilation album from Japanese singer Hitomi Shimatani. It was released on December 25, 2003, and hit #2 on the Oricon charts. It sold 462,668 copies.

Track listing
 Kaihōku
 Papiyon: Papillon
 Ichiba ni Ikō
 Fantasista
 Yasashii Kiss no Mitsukekata
 Shanti
 Amairo no Kami no Otome
 A.S.A.P.: As Soon As Possible
 Itsu no hi ni ka...
 Poinsettia
 Akai Sabaku no Densetsu
 Genki o Dashite
 Perseus
 La Fiesta
 Yume Biyori
 花鳥諷詠 (かちょうふうえい): Song for Everybody

Hitomi Shimatani albums
2003 albums